Martyna Mikołajczak (born 12 May 1991) is a Polish rower. She competed in the women's lightweight double sculls event at the 2016 Summer Olympics.

References

External links
 

1991 births
Living people
Polish female rowers
Olympic rowers of Poland
Rowers at the 2016 Summer Olympics
Sportspeople from Bydgoszcz
European Rowing Championships medalists